The 2006–07 Lega Basket Serie A season, known as the Serie A TIM for sponsorship reasons, was the 85th season of the Lega Basket Serie A, the highest professional basketball league in Italy.

The regular season ran from October 8, 2006 to May 2007, 18 teams played 34 games each. The top 8 teams made the play-offs whilst the lowest ranked teams, Bipop Carire Reggio Emilia and TDShop.it Livorno, were relegated to the Legadue.

Montepaschi Siena won their second title by winning the playoff finals series against VidiVici Bologna.

Regular Season 2006/07 

Teams marked in green qualified for the playoffs. Teams marked in red were relegated to Serie A2. Benetton has been penalized 12 points for signing 19 professional players instead of maximum allowed 18. TDshop.it has been penalized 2 points for budgetary irregularities.

Playoffs 

Quarterfinals

 Montepaschi Siena - Tisettanta Cantù 3-0 (95-76, 97-82, 91-60)
 Armani Jeans Milano - Whirlpool Varese 3-1 (75-72, 77-69, 62-71, 88-77)
 VidiVici Bologna - Angelico Biella 3-2 (87-97, 94-69, 104-102, 79-84, 89-72)
 Lottomatica Roma - Eldo Napoli 3-0 (73-57, 68-64, 83-58)

Semifinals
 Montepaschi Siena - Lottomatica Roma 3-1 (74-88, 84-76, 114-108, 70-49)
 VidiVici Bologna - Armani Jeans Milano 3-1 (75-71, 78-81, 80-73, 81-73)

Finals
 Montepaschi Siena - VidiVici Bologna 3-0 (81-71, 86-65, 90-82)

Individual leaders 

Statistics are for the regular season.

Scoring

Assists

Rebounds

See also 
LBA

Lega Basket Serie A seasons
1
Italy